Scott Donald Sampson (born April 22, 1961) is a Canadian paleontologist and science communicator.  Sampson is currently the Executive Director of California Academy of Sciences in San Francisco, California. He was previously Vice President of Research & Collections and Chief Curator at the Denver Museum of Nature & Science,. Sampson is notable for his work on the carnivorous theropod dinosaurs Majungasaurus and Masiakasaurus and his extensive research into the Late Cretaceous Period, particularly in Madagascar. He is also known as the presenter of the PBS Kids show Dinosaur Train.

Background
Sampson was born in the neighborhood of Dunbar-Southlands in Vancouver, British Columbia. He attended Point Grey Secondary School. Sampson studied for a Ph.D. in Zoology from the University of Toronto. For his doctorate he produced a thesis on two newly found species of ceratopsids, dated to  the Late Cretaceous period in Montana and  the growth and function of ceratopsid horns and frills. Sampson graduated from the University of Toronto in 1993 and worked for a year at the American Museum of Natural History in New York City. Then he worked for five years as an assistant professor of anatomy at the New York College of Osteopathic Medicine on Long Island. In 1999 he accepted positions as assistant professor in the Department of Geology and Geophysics and curator of vertebrate paleontology at the Utah Museum of Natural History (nowadays called the Natural History Museum of Utah and relocated in the new Rio Tinto Center as of 2011). Sampson resided in California at this time, but continued his research  with the Utah museum as a research curator. In February 2013, Sampson took a position as Vice President of Research and Collections at the Denver Museum of Nature and Science.

Sampson is featured as "Dr. Scott the paleontologist" on the PBS television series, Dinosaur Train. In this television series he mentions he gave Masiakasaurus its name and also mentions on a separate episode of The Dinosaur Train that he participated in naming Kosmoceratops. In 2003 he hosted Dinosaur Planet,  a series of four animated nature documentaries which aired on the Discovery Channel. The series was narrated by Christian Slater. His first book, Dinosaur Odyssey: Fossil Threads in the Web of Life was published by University of California Press in 2009. The book, aimed at the general public reconstructs the odyssey of the dinosaurs from their origins on the supercontinent of Pangaea, and explores the way in which dinosaurs ecologically interacted in an expansive web of relationships with other organisms and their natural environment, underscoring "paradigm shifts", which conceptualize the nature of the dinosaurian world.

Research
Aside from his research conducted in museums,  Sampson has undertaken paleontological fieldwork in countries such as Zimbabwe, South Africa and Madagascar as well as the United States and Canada. His specialist fields of research include phylogenetics, functional morphology, and evolution of Late Cretaceous dinosaurs. Sampson is particularly notable for his work on the carnivorous theropod dinosaur Majungasaurus and his studies into the paleobiogeography of Gondwana. In 1995 he made a phylogenetic analysis of the Centrosaurinae and Ceratopsidae in the state of Montana and produced two papers on these horned dinosaurs of the Late Cretaceous. Sampson also published a paper documenting the discovery of the first Tyrannosaurus specimen found in Utah, as well as the first evidence of coexistence between Tyrannosaurus and sauropods.

In 1998 he conducted thorough paleontological studies into the Cretaceous period in Madagascar and published several papers on it. These include Predatory dinosaur remains from Madagascar: Implications for the Cretaceous biogeography of Gondwana. and The theropodan ancestry of birds: New evidence from the Late Cretaceous of Madagascar, both published in 1998. In 2001 he returned to Madagascar and conducted some important research into the evolution of Gondwanan theropods, publishing a paper on it, entitled A bizarre predatory dinosaur from Madagascar: implications for the evolution of Gondwanan theropods. In 2007 he published Dental morphology and variation in Majungasaurus crenatissimus (Theropoda: Abelisauridae) from the Late Cretaceous of Madagascar.

Sampson stresses the importance of evolution in understanding the dynamics of ecology in everyday life and that is underplayed in modern society:

Bibliography

Selected publications
Sampson, S. D. 1995. Two new horned dinosaurs from the Upper Cretaceous Two Medicine Formation of Montana; with a phylogenetic analysis of the Centrosaurinae (Ornithischia: Ceratopsidae). Journal of Vertebrate Paleontology, 15(4): 743–760.

Personal life
He has two daughters and resides in the San Francisco Bay Area with his wife Toni.

References

1961 births
Living people
Canadian paleontologists
People from Vancouver
Canadian curators
University of Toronto alumni
Paleontology in British Columbia